Artech may refer to:
 Arcadia Charter School, a charter school in Northfield, Minnesota, United States
 ARTech Consultores SRL, a Uruguayan software company, creators of GeneXus, Deklarit and Gxportal
 Artech Digital Entertainment, video game developer
 Artech House, a publisher of scientific books